Ernesto Alfonso Robledo Leal (born 6 June 1976 in Linares, Nuevo León) is a Mexican politician affiliated with the PAN. As of 2013 he served as Deputy of the LXII Legislature of the Mexican Congress representing Nuevo León.

References

1976 births
Living people
Politicians from Linares, Nuevo León
National Action Party (Mexico) politicians
21st-century Mexican politicians
Members of the Congress of Nuevo León
Autonomous University of Nuevo León alumni
Members of the Chamber of Deputies (Mexico) for Nuevo León
Deputies of the LXII Legislature of Mexico